Lyford Cay International School is an independent, non-denominational day school for Junior PreKindergarten (JPK) through 12th Grade, offering a full International Baccalaureate Programme. It is located on New Providence island in the Bahamas in the gated community Lyford Cay.

History 
Lyford Cay International School (LCIS) was founded in 1962 by Canadian entrepreneur E.P. Taylor, for children of his employees on the island. Initial enrollment was just 9 students - and 2 teachers, Tom Miller and his wife Francis Miller - but by 1981 these figures had grown to 147 and 9 respectively. The years 1994-97 marked a period of rapid development at the school, with the opening of a new Early Learning Centre and expanded Elementary School. Lyford Cay International School then expanded to include a Secondary School in 2003, receiving IB Middle Years Programme accreditation the same year. The school has offered the IB Diploma Programme since February 2004, the IB Primary Years Programme since 2005 and the IB Career-Related Certificate since 2018. The school's first senior class graduated in 2006. LCIS plans on breaking ground on a new secondary campus in early 2019.

Current 
The student body of 350 at Lyford Cay International School is diverse, representing approximately 24 different countries from across the world, whilst retaining a 35% native Bahamian enrollment.

Recent improvements to the facility include curriculum enhancements in the music and mathematics programs; installation of a six lane 25-meter competitive swimming pool and radical advancement of the school's ICT infrastructure, including the introduction in October 2006 of a 1:1 laptop initiative for students Grade 7 to 12. The school's most principal sports are swimming and soccer, or football.

Accreditation 
Lyford Cay International School is a fully accredited IB World School offering the IB Diploma Programme (DP), the IB Middle Years Programme (MYP), the IB Primary Years Programme (PYP) and the IB Career Related Certificate (CP). It is currently one of a very small number of schools in the Caribbean to offer all four programmes.

Lyford Cay International School is also accredited by the Council of International Schools and the New England Association of Schools and Colleges.

External links

Official School Site

Nassau, Bahamas
International Baccalaureate schools in the Bahamas
International schools in the Bahamas
Educational institutions established in 1962
1962 establishments in the Bahamas